Buba is a city in Guinea-Bissau.

Buba may also refer to:
Buba River, a river in Guinea-Bissau
Buba (clothing), a woman's blouse worn in West African countries
Buba (footballer) (born 1993), Brazilian footballer
Buba (name), a given name and surname
BUBA, Reuters listing for Deutsche Bundesbank
Buba, a serpent-like monster in Albanian folklore
Buba (elephant) (born before 1996), elephant in the Netherlands

See also
Bouba (disambiguation)
Booba (born 1976), A French rapper
Boohbah, a British children's television programme